Allegro non troppo is a 1976 Italian animated film directed by Bruno Bozzetto. Featuring six pieces of classical music, the film is a parody of Walt Disney's 1940 feature film, Fantasia, two of its segments being derived from the earlier film. The classical pieces are set to color animation, ranging from comedy to deep tragedy.

At the beginning, in between the animation, and at the end, there are black and white live-action sequences, displaying the fictional animator, orchestra, conductor and filmmaker, with many humorous scenes about the fictional production of the film. Some of these sections mix animation and live action.

The film was released in two versions. The first includes live action sequences in between the classical pieces; the second version of the film omits these, replacing them with animated Plasticine letters spelling out the title of the next piece of music.

While Allegro Non Troppo spoofs its source, The Walt Disney Company has been positively receptive towards the film. Disney veteran Ward Kimball would recommend the Boléro segment to his animation students, and the Walt Disney Family Museum held an exhibit on Bruno Bozzetto; featuring his work on the film.

Title
In music, an instruction of "allegro ma non troppo" means to play "fast, but not overly so". Without the "ma", it means "Not So Fast!", an interjection meaning "slow down" or "think before you act".

Program 
Claude Debussy's Prélude à l'après-midi d'un faune: an elderly satyr repeatedly attempts to cosmetically recapture his youth and virility, but all in vain.  With each failure, the satyr gets smaller and smaller, until he roams across a vast countryside which turns out to be a woman's body.
Antonín Dvořák's Slavonic Dance No. 7, Op. 46, begins in a large community of cliff-side cave-dwellers. A solitary caveman, wanting to better himself, goes out onto the plain and builds himself a new home. From this point on, the rest of the community copies everything that he does. Annoyed that everyone is able to keep up with his advances so quickly, his attempts to break away from them leads to his planning a bizarre act of mass vengeance with unintended and humorous consequences.
Maurice Ravel's Boléro: liquid at the bottom of a soda bottle left behind by space travelers attains life, and progresses through fanciful representations of the stages of evolution and history until skyscrapers erupt from the ground and destroy all that has come before. This segment parallels The Rite of Spring segment from Fantasia, complete with a solar eclipse. Its opening moment was used as the image for the film poster.
Jean Sibelius's Valse triste: a solitary cat wanders in the ruins of a large house. The cat remembers the life that used to fill the house when it was occupied. Eventually all of these images fade away, as does the cat, just before the ruins are demolished.
Antonio Vivaldi's Concerto in C major, RV 559: a female bee prepares to dine on a flower in elaborate style complete with utensils and a portable TV, but is continually interrupted by two lovers having a romantic interlude on the nearby grass. In the end, after having her meal continually interrupted and each time being forced to gather up her things and scramble to safety, she stings the male on his rump.
Igor Stravinsky's The Firebird (specifically The Princesses' Khorovod and The Infernal Dance of King Katschey) begins with a lump of clay molded by a monotheistic symbol of the omniscient pyramid, first making a few unsuccessful creatures with overly awkward limbs, then finally the Adam and Eve as portrayed in Genesis. Adam and Eve then transform into cel animation and, as in Genesis, the serpent comes up to them, offering the fruits of knowledge in the form of an apple. After they refuse it, the serpent swallows the apple himself. Falling asleep, he is immediately plunged into a nightmare in a hellish environment where he is first tormented by fiery demons and then plagued by all the things that are supposed to corrupt humankind (i.e. sex, alcohol, money, material objects, drugs, violence, etc.); he also grows arms and legs and is magicked into a suit and fedora. When the music ends after he wakes up, he is still wearing the suit and hat, but after telling Adam and Eve his dream in a fast-motion and incomprehensible manner, he sheds the suit (losing his arms and legs but keeping the hat) and spits up the still-whole apple.
In an epilogue sequence, the film's host asks an animated Igor-type monster (identified as "Franceschini") to retrieve a finale for the movie from a basement storeroom. Franceschini rejects several of these, but delightedly approves of one which depicts a ridiculously escalating series of accidents (featuring an assortment of short, unidentified orchestral clips instead of a single piece, though Johannes Brahms' Hungarian Dance No. 5 can be heard at the beginning and Johann Sebastian Bach's Toccata and Fugue in D minor, Dvorak's Slavonic Dance No. 7 (from before) and Franz Liszt's Hungarian Rhapsody No. 2 can be very briefly heard towards the end), ending with the earth exploding in a nuclear war. The action returns to the host and the conductor discussing their next project. After a bit of brainstorming the host reveals his latest original and brilliant idea: Snow White and the Seven Dwarfs with the title Sleeping Beauty. This scene turns out to be another finale being watched by Franceschini. After it ends, the serpent from the Firebird Suite pops out and bites him on the nose, and the words "HAPPY END" drop on them, the serpent peering out of the "D".

Live action sequences
The uncut film also contains comic live action sequences, in black and white blended with occasional color animations, that parody the Deems Taylor introductions from Fantasia.   "The Presenter" (Maurizio Micheli) starts off with an exaggerated version of Taylor's opening introduction in Fantasia ( "A new and original film" .. "you will see the music and hear the drawings" .. "a fantasia") only to be interrupted by a phone call from California informing him that the film had already been done.  He angrily objects, dismissing the caller as an ill-mannered liar, explaining to the audience that the caller claims that someone ("Prisney", "Grisney", "some American") had done this years before, then telling the caller to at least watch the film, and hangs up.  Next the Presenter introduces "The Orchestra Master" (Néstor Garay) and an orchestra made up of little old ladies as the Orchestra Master roughly rounds them up from a cattle pen into a large trailer for transport to the theater. As the trailer heads out to the theater the Presenter exults, "Pisney has already done this?".  Lastly before the first animated music segment (Prélude à l'après-midi d'un faune), the Presenter introduces "The Animator" (Maurizio Nichetti). as the Orchestra Master retrieves him from a dungeon-like cell in which the Animator ("a free artist") has been chained to a wall (as the Presenter puts it: "a binding contract based on trust and mutual respect"). A pretty young cleaning woman (Marialuisa Giovannini) also appears in each segment, although she's barely acknowledged by any of the characters except the Animator (who seems to take an increasing fancy to her as the movie progresses). Each sequence portrays action (like the tossing of a Coca-Cola bottle) that leads directly into the next animated portion of the film and occasionally includes references to a previous segment (such as a chamber pot appearing on the Orchestra Master's head or the female bee and the serpent from their respective segments appearing briefly in the subsequent live-action sequences). After the "Bolero" segment, a gorilla (inspired by the animated character in the Boléro) also appears a few times, first chasing then dancing with The Animator, then later beating up the Orchestra Master who has attacked the Animator.  After the Firebird sequence, the Animator transforms the cleaning woman into a cartoon fairy tale princess and himself into a prince (apparently resembling the titular character and her Prince from Walt Disney's 1937 film, Snow White and the Seven Dwarfs) before both float away leaving the Presenter and Orchestra Master without a finale leading into the epilogue sequence.

Cast
 Maurizio Micheli as The Presenter
 Maurizio Nichetti as The Animator
  as The Orchestra Master
 Maurialuisa Giovannini as The Cleaning Girl
 Osvaldo Salvi as Man in Gorilla costume

See also 
 List of animated package films
 List of Italian films of 1976

References

External links

 
 
 Trailer on YouTube

1976 films
1976 animated films
1970s musical fantasy films
Films directed by Bruno Bozzetto
Films set in abandoned houses
Italian haunted house films
Italian animated films
1970s Italian-language films
Italian musical fantasy films
Animated anthology films
Italian parody films
Italian satirical films
Cultural depictions of Adam and Eve
Disney parodies
Films about classical music and musicians
Films with live action and animation
Animated films based on classical mythology
1970s Italian films